Margaret Julia "Marlo" Thomas (born November 21, 1937) is an American actress, producer, author, and social activist. She is best known for starring on the sitcom That Girl (1966–1971) and her children's franchise Free to Be... You and Me. She has received three Primetime Emmy Awards, a Daytime Emmy Award, a Golden Globe Award, a Peabody Award for her work in television and has been inducted into the Broadcasting and Cable Hall of Fame.

She has also received a Grammy Award for her children's album Marlo Thomas and Friends: Thanks & Giving All Year Long. In 2014, she was awarded the Presidential Medal of Freedom.

Thomas serves as National Outreach Director for St. Jude Children's Research Hospital, which was founded by her father Danny Thomas in 1962. She created the Thanks & Giving campaign in 2004 to support the hospital.

Early life
Thomas was born in Detroit and raised in Beverly Hills, California, the eldest child of Rose Marie Cassaniti and comedian Danny Thomas. She has a sister, Terre, and a brother, producer Tony Thomas. Her father was a Roman Catholic Lebanese American and her mother was Sicilian American. Her godmother was Loretta Young. The name "Marlo" came from her childhood mispronunciation of the name Margo, as Thomas was called by her family.

Thomas attended Marymount High School and graduated from the University of Southern California with a teaching degree: "I wanted a piece of paper that said I was qualified to do something in the world". She was a member of the sorority Kappa Alpha Theta.

Career

Early career
Thomas appeared in many television programs including Bonanza, McHale's Navy, Ben Casey, Arrest and Trial, The Joey Bishop Show, The Many Loves of Dobie Gillis, My Favorite Martian, 77 Sunset Strip, and The Donna Reed Show. Her big break came in 1965 when she was cast by Mike Nichols in the London production of Neil Simon's Barefoot in the Park, co-starring Daniel Massey, Kurt Kasznar, and Mildred Natwick. (In 1986, she was once again cast by Nichols on Broadway in Andrew Bergman's Social Security, co-starring Ron Silver and Olympia Dukakis.)

Thomas and her father, Danny, were cast as Laurie and Ed Dubro in a 1961 episode, "Honor Bright", of CBS' Dick Powell's Zane Grey Theatre.

That Girl

Thomas starred in an ABC pilot called Two's Company in 1965. Although it did not sell, it caught the attention of a network programming executive. He met with Thomas, and expressed interest in casting her in her own series. With their encouragement, Thomas came up with her own idea for a show about a young woman who leaves home, moves to New York City, and struggles to become an actress. The network was initially hesitant, fearing audiences would find a series centering on a single female uninteresting or unrealistic.

The concept eventually evolved into the sitcom entitled That Girl, in which Thomas played Ann Marie, a beautiful, up-and-coming actress with a writer boyfriend, played by Ted Bessell. The series told the daily struggles of Ann holding different temporary jobs while pursuing her dream of a career on Broadway. That Girl was one of the first television shows to focus on a working, single woman who did not live with her parents, and it paved the way for many shows to come. Thomas was only the fourth woman to produce her own series, following Gertrude Berg, Lucille Ball, and Betty White. That Girl aired from 1966 to 1971, producing 136 episodes, and was a solid performer in the Nielsen ratings.

In 1971, Thomas chose to end the series after five years. Both ABC and the show's sponsor, Clairol, wanted the series finale to be a wedding between the two central characters, but Thomas rebuffed them, saying that she felt it was the wrong message to send to her female audience, because it would give the impression that the only happy ending is marriage. That Girl has since become popular in syndication.

Clairol was our sponsor and they wanted to end the show with a wedding. I said, "I just can't do that to these women and girls who followed Ann Marie's adventure. I can't now say that the only happy ending is a wedding, because I don't believe it." There was a big ruckus about it, but I wouldn't do it. The last show, Ann Marie took Donald to a women's lib meeting, which made nobody happy but me. I loved it.

Later career

After That Girl, eager to expand her horizons, Thomas attended the Actors Studio, where she studied with Lee Strasberg until his death in 1982, and subsequently with Strasberg's disciple Sandra Seacat. When she won her Best Dramatic Actress Emmy in 1986 for the TV movie Nobody’s Child, she thanked both individuals.

In 1972, she released a children's book, Free to Be... You and Me, which was inspired by her young niece Dionne Gordon. She went on to create multiple recordings and television specials of and related to that title: Free to Be... You and Me (1972, 1974) and Free to Be... A Family (1987), with Christopher Cerf. Also in 1972, she served as a California delegate to the Democratic National Convention in Miami Beach, Florida. She helped the George McGovern presidential campaign in October 1972 at Star-Spangled Women for McGovern–Shriver, reciting a parody of Erich Segal's Love Story for 19,000 people at Madison Square Garden.

In 1973, Thomas joined Gloria Steinem, Patricia Carbine, and Letty Cottin Pogrebin as the founders of the Ms. Foundation for Women, the first women's fund in the US. The organization was created to deliver funding and other resources to organizations that were presenting liberal women's voices in communities nationwide.

In 1976, Thomas made a guest appearance on the NBC situation comedy The Practice as a stubborn patient of her father Danny Thomas' character Dr. Jules Bedford, and the chemistry of father and daughter acting together made for touching hospital-room scenes.

She has made guest appearances on several television series, including Law & Order: Special Victims Unit (as Judge Mary Conway Clark, a mentor of ADA Casey Novak), Ballers, The New Normal, Wet Hot American Summer: Ten Years Later. She also narrated the series Happily Never After on Investigation Discovery. From 1996 to 2002, Thomas played Rachel Green's mother, Sandra Green, on the TV show Friends.

Thomas appeared in films such as Jenny (1970), Thieves (1977), In The Spirit (1990), The Real Blonde (1997), Starstruck (1998), Deuce Bigalow: Male Gigolo (1999), Playing Mona Lisa (2000), LOL (2012) with Demi Moore and Miley Cyrus, and Cardboard Boxer (2014). She also starred in television movies including It Happened One Christmas (1977; also produced) (a remake of It's a Wonderful Life), The Lost Honor of Kathryn Beck (1984; also produced), Consenting Adult (1985), Nobody's Child (1986; Best Dramatic Actress Emmy), Held Hostage: The Sis and Jerry Levin Story (1991; also produced), Reunion (1994; also produced), Deceit (2004; also produced), and Ultimate Betrayal (1994).

Thomas' Broadway theatre credits include Thieves (1974), Social Security (1986), and The Shadow Box (1994), and in 2011, she starred as Doreen in Elaine May's comedy George Is Dead in Relatively Speaking during a set of three one-act plays (The New York Times called Thomas' performance "sublime"). The other two plays were written by Woody Allen and Ethan Coen.

Off-Broadway, Thomas has appeared in The Guys, The Exonerated (in which she also appeared in Chicago and Boston, co-starring with Brian Dennehy), The Vagina Monologues and Love, Loss, and What I Wore. Also off-Broadway, she appeared opposite Greg Mullavey in the 2015 New York debut of Joe DiPietro's play Clever Little Lies at the Westside Theatre. Regional theatre productions include: Who's Afraid of Virginia Woolf? at the Hartford Stage; Woman In Mind at the Berkshire Theatre Festival; Paper Doll, with F. Murray Abraham at the Pittsburgh Public Theatre; and The Effect of Gamma Rays on Man-in-the-Moon Marigolds at the Cleveland Playhouse. In 1993, she toured in the national company of Six Degrees of Separation. In the spring of 2008, she starred in Arthur Laurents' last play, New Year's Eve with Keith Carradine, at the George Street Playhouse.

Thomas has published seven best-selling books (three of them #1 best-sellers): Free to Be... You and Me; Free to Be... A Family; The Right Words at the Right Time; The Right Words at the Right Time, Volume 2: Your Turn; Marlo Thomas and Friends: Thanks & Giving All Year Long (the CD version of which won the 2006 Grammy Award for Best Spoken Word Album for Children); her 2009 memoir, Growing Up Laughing; and  It Ain't Over...Till It's Over: Reinventing Your Life and Realizing Your Dreams  Anytime, At Any Age.

Thomas serves as the National Outreach Director for St. Jude Children's Research Hospital in Memphis, Tennessee, which was founded by her father, Danny Thomas. She donated all royalties from her 2004 book and CD Marlo Thomas and Friends: Thanks & Giving All Year Long (also produced with Christopher Cerf) and her two Right Words at the Right Time books to the hospital.

In 2010, Thomas created MarloThomas.com, a website for women aged 35+, associated with AOL and the Huffington Post.

Honors
Thomas is the recipient of four Emmy Awards, a Golden Globe Award, a Grammy Award, a Jefferson Award, and the Peabody Award.

In 1979, the Supersisters trading card set was produced and distributed; one of the cards featured Thomas' name and picture.

In 1996, she was awarded the Women in Film Lucy Award in recognition of her excellence and innovation in her creative works that have enhanced the perception of women through the medium of television.

On November 20, 2014, the Marlo Thomas Center for Global Education and Collaboration was opened as part of St. Jude Children's Research Hospital. Hillary Clinton presided over the ribbon-cutting ceremony.

On November 24, 2014, President Barack Obama awarded Thomas the Presidential Medal of Freedom, the nation's highest civilian honor, at a White House ceremony.

Personal life
Thomas was in a long relationship with playwright Herb Gardner.

In 1977, Thomas was a guest on Donahue, the television talk show, when she and host Phil Donahue fell in "love at first sight". They were married on May 21, 1980, and Donahue moved with some of his sons and his daughter from Chicago to New York City to live with Thomas and to produce his talk show there. Thomas is the stepmother to Donahue's four sons and daughter from his first marriage. Concerning her relationship with her stepchildren, Thomas told the AARP magazine in May 2012, "from the very first day, I decided that I was not going to try to be a 'mother' to Phil's children in the traditional sense — they already had a mom — but, instead, to be their friend. I'm proud to say that the friendships I established with them are as strong today as they were 30 years ago — even stronger."

Filmography

Films

Television

References

External links

 MarloThomas.com
 Marlo Thomas at YouTube
 Marlo Thomas at Twitter
 Marlo Thomas at Facebook
 
 
 
 
 All About Marlo Thomas at StJude.org
 Marlo Thomas  Video produced by Makers: Women Who Make America
 Marlo Thomas at the Comedy Hall of Fame
 

1937 births
Activists from Detroit
Activists from Los Angeles
Actresses from Los Angeles
Actors Studio alumni
Actresses from Detroit
American film actresses
American people of Lebanese descent
American people of Italian descent
American stage actresses
American television actresses
Audiobook narrators
A&M Records artists
Bell Records artists
Best Musical or Comedy Actress Golden Globe (television) winners
Grammy Award winners
Lee Strasberg Theatre and Film Institute alumni
Living people
Outstanding Performance by a Lead Actress in a Miniseries or Movie Primetime Emmy Award winners
Presidential Medal of Freedom recipients
St. Jude Children's Research Hospital
20th-century American actresses
21st-century American actresses
USC Rossier School of Education alumni